Leon Springs is an unincorporated community in Bexar County, Texas, now partially within the city limits of San Antonio. According to the Handbook of Texas, the community had a population of 137 in 2000. It is located within the San Antonio Metropolitan Area.

History
The region was settled in the mid-nineteenth century by German immigrants, most notably John O. Meusebach, George von Plehwe, and Max Aue. The Aue Stagecoach Inn became the first stop on the stagecoach route between San Antonio and San Diego, California. The community came to some prominence as the location of an officer training school at Camp Bullis. The original Romano's Macaroni Grill was founded in Leon Springs; however, the company closed down this branch after the second of two devastating floods in July 2002. It was operated by Brinker International. It is also the site for the first Rudy's Country Store and Bar-B-Q. The restaurant chain was created by a descendant of town founder Max Aue, Rudolph Aue. The community currently has Baptist, Roman Catholic, Presbyterian, and non-denominational churches.

Several cavalry units of the Army during World War I were held in Leon Springs, such as the 304th Cavalry Regiment, the 303rd Armored Cavalry Regiment, the 142nd Field Artillery Regiment, and the 153rd Infantry Regiment.

The Arkansas National Guard sent troops to the community for a provisional regiment in 1908 and a 12-day encampment in 1910.

A post office was established at Leon Springs in 1857 and remained in operation until 1918. There was a cotton gin, a general store, and two hotels serving 50 residents in 1885. It became the site of an officer training camp during World War I. The community lost half of its population by the mid-1930s. Camp Stanley was another World War II training school in the community. The population grew to 100 in 1946 and remained steady for the rest of the decade, settling at 137 from 1990 through 2000.

Leon Springs was also the site of the execution of a soldier from Camp Swift for the murder of a young girl. The stage stop closed in 2004 and is reported to be haunted and privately owned.

The San Antonio and Aransas Pass Railway reached Leon Springs in 1887. The stop was originally called Aue Station.

Geography

Education
Residents are in the Northside Independent School District.

Students are zoned to:
 Leon Springs Elementary School and Aue Elementary School 
 Hector Garcia Middle School and Rawlinson Middle School 
 Louis D. Brandeis High School and Tom C. Clark High School

Notable people
 Andrew Davis Bruce, academic, soldier, and third president of the University of Houston.
 Henry W. Butner, a former Army officer.
 John M. Devine, a former Army officer.
 Louis R. Douglass, civil engineer who built army hospitals in Leon Springs.
 Aaron R. Fisher, a former Army officer.
 Anthony Franchini, guitarist.
 John Daniel Leinbach Hartman, a former United States Army officer.
 Doyle Overton Hickey, a former Army officer.
 Harry H. Johnson, a former Army officer.
 Lloyd E. Jones, a former Army officer.
 Louis Jordan, football player who served in World War I and was stationed at Camp Bullis.
 Lesley J. McNair, a former Army officer.
 Troy H. Middleton, a former Army officer, educator, and president at Louisiana State University.
 George Peddy, attorney, military officer, and political figure.
 Adolf Topperwein opened a shooting range in Leon Springs in 1951.
 Samuel Tankersley Williams, senior United States Army officer who attended Camp Bullis.
 Edwin A. Zundel, a former Army officer.

Media
 KCJV-LP, an Oldies broadcast radio station for 97.9 FM, licensed in Leon Springs.

References 

Unincorporated communities in Bexar County, Texas
Unincorporated communities in Texas